is one of the main composers of the Japanese music production I've Sound.

The meaning of his name is "Communication Groove mix". C.G mix has already composed many songs for visual novel games and recently, anime theme songs for the I've Sound singers. Also a singer, he also performs songs for visual games but mostly for BL (Boy's Love) games. In 2001, he joined I've Sound and immediately became a composer and arranger of the group. He also features the use of rock music when creating his music but most of his songs are rather categorized as electronica.

Chronology
At the age of 3, he already learned to play the piano and eventually after 4 years of stay in the primary school, he began composing songs.
1994—his debut in the music industry with his song "Lunar Dance".
1996—"Crazy for You" was released under Fuctory Records.
2001—he joined I've Sound.
October 15, 2005—participated at the first I've Sound concert, "I've in Budokan 2005: Open the Birth Gate"
July 14, 2006—released his debut album In Your Life'' under Geneon Entertainment.

Discography

Indies

"Lunar Dance"
– Original Mix (Lyrics: Ayumi Kida; Composition/Arrangement: C.G mix)
– Special S.P.R. Mix (Lyrics: Ayumi Kida; Composition: C.G mix; Arrangement: S.P.R.)
"Crazy for You"
– Club Mix (Lyrics: Ayumi Kida; Composition: C.G mix; Arrangement: Kazuya Takase)
– 80's Burst Mix (Lyrics: Ayumi Kida; Composition/Arrangement: C.G mix)
– Floor Style Instrumental (Lyrics: Ayumi Kida; Composition/Arrangement: C.G mix)
"Miokurukara: Metamorphose" (Lyrics: Ayumi Kida; Composition/Arrangement: C.G mix) (Published on web only)

In Your Life
Released July 14, 2006

CD track listing
Sky was g-ray
Lyrics: Ayumi Kida
Composition: C.G mix
Arrangement: Kazuya Takase
E.I.E.N
Lyrics: Ayumi Kida
Composition/Arrangement: C.G mix
version up
Lyrics: Ayumi Kida
Composition/Arrangement: C.G mix
Point
Lyrics: Ayumi Kida
Composition/Arrangement: C.G mix
Detect
Lyrics: Ayumi Kida
Composition/Arrangement: C.G mix
distress
Lyrics: Ayumi Kida
Composition/Arrangement: C.G mix
Aozora wo Machi Nagara
Lyrics: Masahiro Sato
Composition/Arrangement: C.G mix
preserve
Lyrics: Ayumi Kida
Composition/Arrangement: C.G mix
Please turn over
Lyrics: Ayumi Kida
Composition/Arrangement: C.G mix
Miokuru Kara
Lyrics: Ayumi Kida
Composition/Arrangement: C.G mix
in your life
Lyrics: Ayumi Kida
Composition/Arrangement: C.G mix
Welcome to Heaven! -in your life version-
Lyrics: AIS
Composition/Arrangement: C.G mix

Pray
Released April 29, 2009

CD track listing
under the darkness
Lyrics: A.I.
Composition: C.G mix
Arrangement: C.G mix, Takeshi Ozaki
Everything is assumed to be connected
Lyrics: Masashi Sato
Composition/Arrangement: C.G mix
judge
Lyrics: Ayumi Kida
Composition/Arrangement: C.G mix

Lyrics: Ayumi Kida
Composition/Arrangement: C.G mix
DAY IN
Lyrics: Ayumi Kida
Composition/Arrangement: C.G mix
flat
Lyrics/Composition/Arrangement: C.G mix
Face of Fact
Lyrics: KOTOKO
Composition/Arrangement: C.G mix
Swept Away
Lyrics: Masashi Sato
Composition/Arrangement: C.G mix

Lyrics: Ayumi Kida
Composition/Arrangement: C.G mix
pray
Lyrics: Masashi Sato
Composition/Arrangement: C.G mix
BLUE
Lyrics: Ayumi Kida
Composition/Arrangement: C.G mix
under the darkness -four piece band mix-
Lyrics: A.I.
Composition: C.G mix
Arrangement: C.G mix, Takeshi Ozaki

DVD track listing
under the darkness (Promotional Video)

Other songs 
Welcome to Heaven! (学園ヘヴン！ PS2版)
Welcome to Heaven! -Remix- (学園ヘヴン おかわりっ!)
Under the Darkness (鬼畜眼鏡)
Under the Darkness -Remix- (鬼畜眼鏡R)
True Eyes (STEAL!)

References

External links
LOW TRANCE ASSEMBLY 
North Web-music- 
C.G MIX GENEON UNIVERSAL OFFICIAL WEB SITE 

Japanese male pop singers
I've Sound members
Living people
Year of birth missing (living people)